Simoselaps littoralis, also known as the west coast banded snake or coastal burrowing snake, is a species of venomous burrowing snake that is endemic to Australia. The specific epithet littoralis (“coastal”) refers to the species’ distribution  and habitat.

Description
The species grows to an average of about 39 cm in length.

Behaviour
The species is oviparous, with an average clutch size of four.

Distribution and habitat
The species occurs in coastal dune and heath habitats along the west coast of Western Australia south of Exmouth, including coastal islands.

References

 
littoralis
Snakes of Australia
Endemic fauna of Australia
Reptiles of Western Australia
Taxa named by Glen Milton Storr
Reptiles described in 1968